Cyberspace is a cyberpunk role-playing game published by Iron Crown Enterprises and using a somewhat modified version of their Spacemaster ruleset.

Description
The primary setting of Cyberspace is the urban sprawl around San Francisco in the year 2090.

Publication history
The game was written by Tod Foley, who also worked on a number of Iron Crown's Spacemaster supplements. The game was out of print and unavailable for a number of years around the turn of the millennium, but is now available, with all of its supplements, from the publisher's homepage in a PDF format.

Character classes
Character classes for Cyberspace include:
Jockey, primarily a pilot and driver of almost any vehicle, also jack-of-all-trades
Killer, a combat specialist
Net Junkie, a computer hacker
Sleaze, a specialist in social skills
Tech Rat, technical wizard

Reception
Cyberspace was ranked 44th in the 1996 reader poll of Arcane magazine to determine the 50 most popular roleplaying games of all time. The UK magazine's editor Paul Pettengale commented: "One of the most detailed cyberpunk rules systems, what really sets Cyberspace apart is its cybertechnology. Rather than presenting a shopping list of things your character could have implanted in his or her anatomy, Cyberspace includes full rules for designing customised cyberware. By connecting sub-systems to 3 different inputs, outputs, activation controls and power sources, players can create their own systems."

Reviews
White Wolf #21 (June/July, 1990)

References

External links
Official Page for Cyberspace
RPG Encyclopedia entry
Listing of all ICE Cyberspace products at RPGnet
Roleplaying Games by Tod Foley

 
Cyberpunk role-playing games
Iron Crown Enterprises games
Role-playing games introduced in 1989